Shuford–Hoover House is a historic home located near Blackburn, Catawba County, North Carolina. The original section was built about 1790, and is a one-story, weatherboarded log structure.  The front section was added about 1840, and is a one-story frame cottage in a transitional Federal / Greek Revival style. The two sections are linked together by a center porch-like room added about 1925.

It was listed on the National Register of Historic Places in 1990.

References

Houses on the National Register of Historic Places in North Carolina
Houses completed in 1790
Federal architecture in North Carolina
Neoclassical architecture in North Carolina
Houses in Catawba County, North Carolina
National Register of Historic Places in Catawba County, North Carolina